Enchanted April may refer to:

 The Enchanted April, the 1922 novel by Elizabeth von Arnim
 Enchanted April (1935 film)
 Enchanted April (1991 film)
 Enchanted April (2003 play) Tony-nominated Broadway production 
 a 2010 musical stage adaptation by Charles Leipart and Richard Bunger Evans